Friedrich von Grote (22 April 1885 – 15 October 1925) was a German equestrian. He competed in the individual jumping at the 1912 Summer Olympics.

References

External links
 

1885 births
1925 deaths
German male equestrians
Olympic equestrians of Germany
Equestrians at the 1912 Summer Olympics
Sportspeople from Mecklenburg-Western Pomerania